The Vatican City Suppercoppa is an annual football domestic cup match for teams of Vatican City. The inaugural Suppercoppa was held in 2005. The Supercoppa is contested between the winners of the Vatican City Championship and the winners of the Coppa Sergio Valci.

Champions

 Source:

Results by team

 Source:

References

Footnotes

Recurring sporting events established in 2005
National association football cups
2005 establishments in Europe
Football in the Vatican City